The 49th Annual Grammy Awards was a ceremony honoring the best in music for the recording year beginning October 1, 2005 and ending September 30, 2006 in the United States. The awards were handed out on Sunday, February 11, 2007 at the Staples Center in Los Angeles. The Dixie Chicks were the night's biggest winners winning a total of five awards. Mary J. Blige received the most nominations, with eight. Don Henley was honored as MusiCares Person of the Year two nights prior to the show on February 9, 2007. The show won an Emmy for Outstanding Lighting Direction (electronic, multicamera) for VMC Programming.

Main ceremony 

The performance of Roxanne by The Police to open the show promoted the start of their reunion tour.

Presenters 
Main ceremony

 Jaime Foxx – presented Best Pop Collaboration with Vocals
 Joan Baez – introduced Dixie Chicks
 Prince – introduced Beyoncé
 The Black Eyed Peas – presented Best R&B Album
 P!nk & T.I. – presented Best Female R&B Vocal Performance
 Stevie Wonder – introduced Corinne Bailey Rae, John Legend & John Mayer
 Nelly Furtado, Natasha Bedingfield & Nicole Scherzinger – presented Best Pop Vocal Album
 Burt Bacharach & Seal – presented Song of the Year
 Alyson Hannigan & Cobie Smulders – introduced Gnarls Barkley
 Common & Kanye West – presented Best Rap Album
 Terrence Howard – introduced Mary J. Blige
 Mandy Moore, LeAnn Rimes & Luke Wilson – presented Best Country Album
 Reba McEntire – introduced Carrie Underwood & Rascal Flatts
 Natalie Cole & Ornette Coleman – presented Best New Artist
 Samuel L. Jackson & Christina Ricci – introduced Lionel Richie, Chris Brown & Smokey Robinson
 Rihanna & David Spade – introduced Ludacris, Mary J. Blige & Earth, Wind & Fire
 Jennifer Hudson – introduced My Grammy Moment Winner Robyn Troup
 Tony Bennett & Quentin Tarantino – presented Record of the Year
 Chris Rock – introduced Red Hot Chili Peppers
 Al Gore & Queen Latifah – presented Best Rock Album
 Don Henley & Scarlett Johansson – presented Album of the Year

Winners and nominees
Multiple nominees and wins (award nominations/wins)

 Mary J. Blige (8/3)
 Dixie Chicks (5/5)
 John Mayer (5/2)
 James Blunt (5/0)
 Red Hot Chili Peppers (4/3)
 Gnarls Barkley (4/2)
 Justin Timberlake (4/2)
 Carrie Underwood (3/2)

Bold type indicates the winner out of the list of nominees.

General
Record of the Year
"Not Ready to Make Nice" – Dixie Chicks
Rick Rubin, producer; Richard Dodd, Jim Scott & Chris Testa, engineers/mixers
"Be Without You" – Mary J. Blige
Bryan-Michael Cox & Ron Fair producers; Danny Cheung, Tal Herzberg, Dave "Hard-Drive" Pensado & Allen Sides, engineers/mixers
"You're Beautiful" – James Blunt
Tom Rothrock, producer; Tom Rothrock & Mike Tarantino, engineers/mixers
"Crazy" – Gnarls Barkley
Danger Mouse, producer; Ben H. Allen, Danger Mouse & Kennie Takahashi, engineers/mixers
"Put Your Records On" – Corinne Bailey Rae
Steve Chrisanthou, producer; Steve Chrisanthou & Jeremy Wheatley, engineers/mixers
Album of the Year
Taking the Long Way – Dixie Chicks
Rick Rubin, producer; Richard Dodd, Jim Scott & Chris Testa, engineers/mixers; Richard Dodd, mastering engineer
St. Elsewhere – Gnarls Barkley
Danger Mouse, producer; Ben H. Allen, Danger Mouse & Kennie Takahashi, engineers/mixers; Mike Lazer, mastering engineer
Continuum – John Mayer
Steve Jordan & John Mayer, producers; John Alagía, Michael Brauer, Joe Ferla, Chad Franscoviak, Manny Marroquin & Dave O'Donnell, engineers/mixers; Greg Calbi, mastering engineer
Stadium Arcadium – Red Hot Chili Peppers
Rick Rubin, producer; Ryan Hewitt, Mark Linett & Andrew Scheps, engineers/mixers; Vlado Meller, mastering engineer
FutureSex/LoveSounds – Justin Timberlake
Nate (Danja) Hills, Jawbreakers, Rick Rubin, Timbaland & Justin Timberlake, producers; Jimmy Douglass, Serban Ghenea, Padraic Kerin, Jason Lader, Andrew Scheps, Timbaland & Ethan Willoughby, engineers/mixers; Herb Powers, Jr., mastering engineer

Song of the Year
"Not Ready to Make Nice" – Dixie Chicks
Martie Maguire, Natalie Maines, Emily Robison & Dan Wilson, songwriters 
"Be Without You" – Mary J. Blige
Johntá Austin, Mary J. Blige, Bryan-Michael Cox & Jason Perry, songwriters
"Jesus, Take The Wheel" – Carrie Underwood
Brett James, Hillary Lindsey & Gordie Sampson, songwriters
"Put Your Records On" – Corinne Bailey Rae
John Beck, Steve Chrisanthou & Corinne Bailey Rae, songwriters
"You're Beautiful" – James Blunt
James Blunt, Amanda Ghost & Sacha Skarbek, songwriters
Best New Artist
Carrie Underwood
Chris Brown
Corinne Bailey Rae
Imogen Heap
James Blunt

Grammy Award for Best Recording Package
10,000 Days - Tool by Adam Jones
The Best Worst-Case Scenario - Fair by Ryan Clark 
Personal File - Johnny Cash by Randall Martin  
Reprieve - Ani DiFranco by Ani DiFranco and Brian Grunert  
 Versions by Thievery Corporation

Alternative
Best Alternative Music Album
St. Elsewhere – Gnarls Barkley
Whatever People Say I Am, That's What I'm Not – Arctic Monkeys
At War with the Mystics – The Flaming Lips
Show Your Bones – Yeah Yeah Yeahs
The Eraser – Thom Yorke

Blues
Best Traditional Blues Album
Risin' with the Blues – Ike Turner
Brother To The Blues – Tab Benoit & Louisiana's Leroux
Bronx In Blue – Dion
People Gonna Talk – James Hunter
Guitar Groove-A-Rama – Duke Robillard

Best Contemporary Blues Album
After the Rain – Irma Thomas
Live from Across the Pond – Robert Cray Band
Sippiand Hericana – Dr. John & The Lower 911
Suitcase – Keb' Mo'
Hope and Desire – Susan Tedeschi

Country
Best Female Country Vocal Performance
"Jesus, Take the Wheel" – Carrie Underwood
"Kerosene" – Miranda Lambert
"I Still Miss Someone" – Martina McBride
"Something's Gotta Give" – LeAnn Rimes
"I Don't Feel Like Loving You Today" – Gretchen Wilson

Best Male Country Vocal Performance
"The Reason Why" – Vince Gill
"Every Mile a Memory" – Dierks Bentley
"The Seashores of Old Mexico" – George Strait
"Would You Go with Me" – Josh Turner
"Once in a Lifetime" – Keith Urban

Best Country Performance by a Duo or Group with Vocal
"Not Ready to Make Nice" – Dixie Chicks
"Heaven's My Home" – The Duhks
"Boondocks" – Little Big Town
"What Hurts the Most" – Rascal Flatts
"Leave The Pieces" – The Wreckers

Best Country Collaboration with Vocals
"Who Says You Can't Go Home" – Bon Jovi & Jennifer Nettles
 "Tomorrow Is Forever" – Solomon Burke & Dolly Parton
 "Calling Me" – Kenny Rogers & Don Henley
 "Midnight Angel" – Rhonda Vincent & Bobby Osborne
 "Love Will Always Win" – Trisha Yearwood & Garth Brooks

Best Country Instrumental Performance
 "Whiskey Before Breakfast" – Bryan Sutton & Doc Watson
 "Jerusalem Ridge" – Casey Driessen
 "Gameshow Rag/Cannonball Rag" – Tommy Emmanuel
 "The Eleventh Reel" – Chris Thile
 "Nature of the Beast" – Jim VanCleve

Best Country Song
 "Jesus, Take The Wheel" 
 Brett James, Hillary Lindsey & Gordie Sampson, songwriters (Carrie Underwood)
 "Every Mile a Memory"
 Brett Beavers, Dierks Bentley & Steve Bogard, songwriters (Dierks Bentley)
 "I Don't Feel Like Loving You Today"
 Matraca Berg & Jim Collins, songwriters (Gretchen Wilson)
 "Like Red on a Rose"
 Melanie Castleman & Robert Lee Castleman, songwriters (Alan Jackson)
 "What Hurts the Most"
 Steve Robson & Jeffrey Steele, songwriters (Rascal Flatts)

Best Country Album
 Taking the Long Way – Dixie Chicks
 Like Red on a Rose – Alan Jackson
 The Road to Here – Little Big Town
 You Don't Know Me: The Songs of Cindy Walker – Willie Nelson
 Your Man – Josh Turner

Best Bluegrass Album
"Instrumentals" – Ricky Skaggs & Kentucky Thunder

Dance
Best Dance Recording
"SexyBack"
Nate "Danja" Hills, Timbaland & Justin Timberlake, producers; Jimmy Douglass, mixer (Justin Timberlake)
"Suffer Well"
Ben Hillier, producer; Steve Fitzmaurice & Ben Hillier, mixers (Depeche Mode)
"Ooh La La"
Goldfrapp, producers; Mark "Spike" Stent, mixer (Goldfrapp)
"Get Together"
Madonna & Stuart Price, producers; Mark "Spike" Stent, mixer (Madonna)
"I'm With Stupid"
Trevor Horn, producer; Robert Orton, mixer (Pet Shop Boys)

Best Electronic/Dance Album
Confessions On A Dance Floor – MadonnaSupernature – Goldfrapp
A Lively Mind – Paul Oakenfold
Fundamental – Pet Shop Boys
The Garden – Zero 7

Folk
Best Traditional Folk AlbumWe Shall Overcome: The Seeger Sessions – Bruce Springsteen
I Stand Alone – Ramblin' Jack Elliot
Gonna Let It Shine – Odetta
Adieu False Heart – Linda Ronstadt & Ann Savoy
A Distant Land to Roam: Songs of The Carter Family – Ralph Stanley

Best Contemporary Folk/American Album
Modern Times – Bob Dylan
Solo Acoustic, Vol. 1 – Jackson Browne
Black Cadillac – Rosanne Cash
Workbench Songs – Guy Clark
All the Roadrunning – Mark Knopfler & Emmylou Harris

Best Native American Music Album
Dance with the Wind - Mary Youngblood

Best Hawaiian Music Album
Huana Ke Aloha – Tia Carrere, Daniel Ho & Amy Ku'uleialoha

Gospel
Best Gospel Performance
"Victory" – Yolanda Adams
"Not Forgotten" – Israel and New Breed
"The Blessing Of Abraham" – Donald Lawrence & The Tri-City Singers
"Made To Worship" – Chris Tomlin
"Victory" – Tye Tribbett & G.A.

Best Gospel Song
"Imagine Me" – Kirk Franklin
"The Blessing Of Abraham" – Donald Lawrence
"Mountain Of God" – Brown Bannister & Mac Powell
"Not Forgotten" – Israel Houghton & Aaron Lindsey
"Victory" – Tye Tribbett

Best Southern, Country or Bluegrass Gospel Album
Glory Train – Randy TravisKenny Bishop – Kenny Bishop
Give It Away – Gaither Vocal Band
Precious Memories – Alan Jackson
The Promised Land – The Del McCoury Band

Best Traditional Gospel AlbumAlive In South Africa – Israel and New BreedAn Invitation To Worship – Byron Cage
Paved The Way – The Caravans
Still Keeping It Real – The Dixie Hummingbirds
Finalé Act One – Donald Lawrence & The Tri-City Singers

Best Contemporary R&B Gospel AlbumHero – Kirk FranklinSet Me Free – Myron Butler & Levi
A Timeless Christmas – Israel and New Breed
This Is Me – Kierra Sheard
Victory Live! – Tye Tribbett & G.A.

Best Rock or Rap Gospel AlbumTurn Around – Jonny LangBone-A-Fide – T-Bone
End of Silence – Red
DecembeRadio – DecembeRadio
Where the Past Meets Today – Sarah Kelly

Jazz
 Best Contemporary Jazz AlbumThe Hidden Land – Béla Fleck and the Flecktones
People People Music Music – Groove Collective
Rewind That – Christian Scott
Sexotica – Sex Mob
Who Let the Cats Out? – Mike Stern

 Best Jazz Vocal Album
Turned To Blue – Nancy Wilson
Footprints – Karrin Allyson
Easy To Love – Roberta Gambarini
Live At Jazz Standard With Fred Hersch – Nancy King
From This Moment On – Diana Krall

 Best Jazz Instrumental Solo
"Some Skunk Funk" – Michael Brecker
"Paq Man" – Paquito D'Rivera
"Freedom Jazz Dance" – Taylor Eigsti
"Hippidy Hop" (Drum Solo) – Roy Haynes
"Hope" – Branford Marsalis

Best Jazz Instrumental Album, Individual or Group
The Ultimate Adventure – Chick Corea
Sound Grammar – Ornette Coleman
Saudades – Trio Beyond
Beyond the Wall – Kenny Garrett
Sonny, Please – Sonny Rollins

 Best Large Jazz Ensemble Album
Some Skunk Funk – Randy Brecker with Michael Brecker, Jim Beard, Will Lee, Peter Erskine, Marcio Doctor and Vince Mendoza conducting The WDR Big Band Köln
Spirit Music – Bob Brookmeyer and the New Art Orchestra
Streams of Expression – the Joe Lovano Ensemble
Live In Tokyo At The Blue Note – Mingus Big Band
Up From The Skies, Music of Jim McNeely – The Vanguard Jazz Orchestra

 Best Latin Jazz Album
Simpático – The Brian Lynch/Eddie Palmieri Project
Codes – Ignacio Berroa
Cubist Music – Edsel Gomez
Absolute Quintet – Dafnis Prieto
Viva – Diego Urcola, Edward Simon, Avishai Cohen, Antonio Sánchez and Pernell Saturnino

Latin
Best Latin Pop Album:
 Adentro – Ricardo Arjona
 Limón y sal – Julieta Venegas
 Lo que trajo el barco – Obie Bermúdez
 Individual – Fulano
 Trozos de mi alma 2 – Marco Antonio Solis

Best Latin Rock, Alternative Or Urban Album:
 Amar es combatir – Maná
 Lo demás es plástico – Black Guayaba
 The Underdog / El subestimado – Tego Calderón
 Calle 13 – Calle 13
 Superpop Venezuela de Amigos Invisibles

Best Tropical Latin Album:
 Directo al corazón – Gilberto Santa Rosa
 Fuzionando – Oscar D'Leon
 Salsatón: Salsa con reggaetón – Andy Montañez
 Hoy, mañana y siempre – Tito Nieves
 What You've Been Waiting For – Lo que esperabas – Tiempo Libre

Best Mexican / Mexican-American Album:
 Historias de mi tierra – Pepe Aguilar
 No es brujería – Ana Bárbara
 25 Aniversario – Mariachi Sol de Mexico de José Hernández
 A toda ley – Pablo Montero
 Orgullo de mujer – Alicia Villarreal

Best Tejano Album:
 Sigue el Taconazo – Chente Barrera y Taconazo
 Also nominated were:
 Live In Session – Bob Gallarza
 All Of Me – Jay Perez
 Rebecca Valadez – Rebecca Valadez

Best Norteño Album:
 Historias que contar – Tigres del Norte
 Algo de mí – Conjunto Primavera
 Puro pa' arriba – Huracanes del Norte
 Piénsame un momento – Pesado
 Prefiero la soledad – Retoño

Best Banda Album:
 Más allá del sol – Joan Sebastian
 20 vil heridas – Banda Machos
 Mas fuerte que nunca – Banda El Recodo de Cruz Lizárraga
 Amor gitano – Cuisillos
 A mucha honra – Ezequiel Peña

New Age
Best New Age Album
Amaratine – Enya
A posteriori – Enigma
Beyond Words – Gentle Thunder, Will Clipman & AmoChip Dabney
Elements Series: Fire – Peter Kater
The Magical Journeys of Andreas Vollenweider – Andreas Vollenweider

Pop
Best Female Pop Vocal Performance
"Ain't No Other Man" – Christina Aguilera
"Unwritten" – Natasha Bedingfield
"You Can Close Your Eyes" – Sheryl Crow
"Stupid Girls" – P!nk
"Black Horse and the Cherry Tree" – KT Tunstall

Best Male Pop Vocal Performance
"Waiting On The World To Change" – John Mayer
"You're Beautiful" – James Blunt
"Save Room" – John Legend
"Jenny Wren" – Paul McCartney
"Bad Day" – Daniel Powter

Grammy Award for Best Pop Performance by a Duo or Group with Vocals
"My Humps" – The Black Eyed Peas
"I Will Follow You Into The Dark" – Death Cab For Cutie
"Over My Head (Cable Car)" – The Fray
"Is It Any Wonder?" – Keane
"Stickwitu" – The Pussycat Dolls

Best Pop Collaboration With Vocals
"For Once in My Life" – Tony Bennett & Stevie Wonder
"One" – Mary J. Blige & U2
"Always On Your Side" – Sheryl Crow & Sting
"Promiscuous" – Nelly Furtado & Timbaland
"Hips Don't Lie" – Shakira & Wyclef Jean

Best Pop Instrumental Performance
"Mornin'" – George Benson & Al Jarreau
"Drifting" – Enya
"Subterfuge" – Béla Fleck & The Flecktones
"Song H" – Bruce Hornsby
"My Favorite Things" – The Brian Setzer Orchestra

Best Pop Instrumental Album
Fingerprints – Peter Frampton
New Beginnings – Gerald Albright
Fire Wire – Larry Carlton
X – Fourplay
Wrapped in a Dream – Spyro Gyra

Best Pop Vocal Album
Continuum – John Mayer
Back to Basics – Christina Aguilera
Back to Bedlam – James Blunt
The River in Reverse – Elvis Costello & Allen Toussaint
FutureSex/LoveSounds – Justin Timberlake

R&B
Best Female R&B Vocal Performance
"Be Without You" – Mary J. Blige
"Don't Forget About Us" – Mariah Carey
"Ring the Alarm" – Beyoncé
"Day Dreaming" – Natalie Cole
"I Am Not My Hair" – India.Arie
Best Male R&B Vocal Performance
"Heaven" – John Legend
"Black Sweat" – Prince
"Got You Home" – Luther Vandross
"So Sick" – Ne-Yo
"I Call It Love" – Lionel Richie

Grammy Award for Best R&B Performance by a Duo or Group with Vocals
"Family Affair" – Sly & The Family Stone, John Legend, Joss Stone & Van Hunt
"Breezin'" – George Benson & Al Jarreau
"Love Changes" – Jamie Foxx & Mary J. Blige
"Everyday (Family Reunion)" – Chaka Khan, Gerald Levert, Yolanda Adams & Carl Thomas
"Beautiful, Loved And Blessed" – Prince & Támar

Best Traditional R&B Vocal Performance
"God Bless the Child" – George Benson, Al Jarreau & Jill Scott
"Christmas Time Is Here" – Anita Baker
"I Found My Everything" – Mary J. Blige & Raphael Saadiq
"You Are So Beautiful" – Sam Moore Featuring Billy Preston, Zucchero, Eric Clapton & Robert Randolph
"How Sweet It Is (To Be Loved by You)" – The Temptations

Best Urban/Alternative Performance
"Crazy" – Gnarls Barkley
"3121" – Prince
"Idlewild Blue (Don't Chu Worry 'Bout Me)" – Outkast
"That Heat" – Sérgio Mendes, Erykah Badu & will.i.am
"Mas Que Nada" – Sérgio Mendes & The Black Eyed Peas

Best R&B Song
"Be Without You" – Mary J. Blige
Johnta Austin, Mary J. Blige, Bryan-Michael Cox & Jason Perry songwriters
"Black Sweat"  –  Prince 
Prince songwriter
"Deja Vu" – Beyoncé & Jay-Z
Shawn Carter, Rodney "Darkchild" Jerkins, Beyoncé, Makeba Riddick, Keli Nicole Price, Delisha Thomas & John Webb songwriters
"Don't Forget About Us" – Mariah Carey
Johnta Austin, Mariah Carey, Bryan-Michael Cox & Jermaine Dupri songwriters
"I Am Not My Hair" – India.Arie
Drew Ramsey, Shannon Sanders & India Arie Simpson songwriters

Best R&B Album
The Breakthrough – Mary J. Blige
Unpredictable – Jamie Foxx
Testimony: Vol. 1, Life & Relationship – India.Arie
3121 –  Prince
Coming Home – Lionel Richie

Best Contemporary R&B Album
B'Day – Beyoncé
Chris Brown – Chris Brown
20 Y.O. –  Janet Jackson
Kelis Was Here – Kelis
In My Own Words –  Ne-Yo

Rap
Best Rap Solo Performance
"What You Know" – T.I.
"Touch It" – Busta Rhymes
"We Run This" – Missy Elliott
"Kick, Push" – Lupe Fiasco
"Undeniable" – Mos Def

Best Rap Performance By A Duo Or Group
"Ridin" – Chamillionaire featuring Krayzie Bone
"Georgia"  –  Ludacris & Field Mob featuring Jamie Foxx
"Grillz"  –  Nelly featuring Paul Wall, Ali & Gipp
"Mighty "O""  –  Outkast
"Don't Feel Right"  –  The Roots

Best Rap/Sung Collaboration
"My Love" – Justin Timberlake featuring T.I.
"Smack That"  –  Akon featuring Eminem
"Deja Vu"  –  Beyoncé featuring Jay-Z
"Shake That"  –  Eminem featuring Nate Dogg
"Unpredictable"  –  Jamie Foxx featuring Ludacris

Best Rap Song
"Money Maker"
Christopher Bridges & Pharrell Williams, songwriters (Ludacris featuring Pharrell)
"It's Goin' Down"
Chadron Moore & Jasiel Robinson, songwriters (Yung Joc)
"Kick, Push"
Wasalu Muhammad Jaco, songwriter (Lupe Fiasco)
"Ridin"
Anthony Henderson, J. Salinas, O. Salinas & Hakeem Seriki, songwriters (Chamillionaire featuring Krayzie Bone)
"What You Know" – T.I.
A. Davis & Clifford Harris, songwriters; (Donny Hathaway, Leroy Hutson & Curtis Mayfield, songwriters) (T.I.)

Best Rap Album
Release Therapy – LudacrisLupe Fiasco's Food & Liquor –  Lupe Fiasco
In My Mind –  Pharrell
Game Theory – The Roots
King – T.I.

Reggae
Best Reggae AlbumLove Is My Religion – Ziggy Marley
Too Bad – Buju Banton
Youth – Matisyahu
Rhythm Doubles – Sly and Robbie
Who You Fighting For? – UB40

Rock
Best Solo Rock Vocal Performance
"Someday Baby" – Bob Dylan
"Nausea" – Beck
"Route 66" – John Mayer
"Saving Grace" – Tom Petty
"Lookin' for a Leader" – Neil Young

Best Rock Performance by a Duo or Group with Vocal
"Dani California" – Red Hot Chili Peppers
"Talk" – Coldplay
"How to Save a Life" – The Fray
"Steady, As She Goes" – The Raconteurs
"The Saints Are Coming" – U2 & Green Day

Best Hard Rock Performance
"Woman" – Wolfmother
"Crazy Bitch" – Buckcherry
"Every Day Is Exactly the Same" – Nine Inch Nails
"Lonely Day" – System of a Down
"Vicarious" – Tool

Best Metal Performance
"Eyes of the Insane" – Slayer
"Redneck" – Lamb of God
"Colony of Birchmen" – Mastodon
"LiesLiesLies" – Ministry
"30/30-150" – Stone Sour

Best Rock Instrumental Performance
"The Wizard Turns On..." – The Flaming Lips
"Chun Li's Spinning Bird Kick" – Arctic Monkeys
"Black Hole Sun" – Peter Frampton
"Castellorizon" – David Gilmour
"Super Colossal" – Joe Satriani

Best Rock Song
"Dani California" – Red Hot Chili Peppers
Flea, John Frusciante, Anthony Kiedis & Chad Smith songwriters
"Chasing Cars" – Snow Patrol
Nathan Connolly, Gary Lightbody, Jonny Quinn, Tom Simpson & Paul Wilson songwriters
"Lookin' for a Leader" – Neil Young 
Neil Young songwriter
"Someday Baby"  –  Bob Dylan 
Bob Dylan songwriter
"When You Were Young" – The Killers
Brandon Flowers, Dave Keuning, Mark Stoermer & Ronnie Vannucci songwriters

Best Rock Album
Stadium Arcadium – Red Hot Chili Peppers
Try! – John Mayer Trio
Highway Companion – Tom Petty
Broken Boy Soldiers – The Raconteurs
Living with War – Neil Young

Traditional Pop
Best Traditional Pop Vocal Album
Duets: An American Classic – Tony Bennett
Caught In The Act – Michael Bublé
Wintersong –  Sarah McLachlan
Bette Midler Sings the Peggy Lee Songbook –  Bette Midler
Timeless Love – Smokey Robinson

Children's
Best Musical Album for Children
Catch That Train! - Dan Zanes and Friends

Best Spoken Word Album for Children
Blah Blah Blah: Stories About Clams, Swamp Monsters, Pirates & Dogs – Bill Harley
Christmas In The Trenches – John McCutcheon
Disney's Little Einsteins Musical Missions (Various Artists) – Ted Kryczko & Ed Mitchell, producers
Peter Pan – Jim Dale
The Witches – Lynn Redgrave

Spoken Word
Best Spoken Word Album (Includes Poetry, Audio Books & Story Telling)
Our Endangered Values: America's Moral Crisis – Jimmy Carter
With Ossie And Ruby: In This Life Together – Ossie Davis & Ruby Dee (tie)
I Shouldn't Even Be Doing This! – Bob Newhart
New Rules — Polite Musings From A Timid Observer – Bill Maher
The Truth (with jokes) – Al Franken

Comedy
Best Comedy Album (For comedy recordings, spoken or musical)
The Carnegie Hall Performance – Lewis Black
Blue Collar Comedy Tour – One For The Road – Bill Engvall, Ron White, Jeff Foxworthy & Larry The Cable Guy
Life Is Worth Losing – George Carlin
Straight Outta Lynwood – "Weird Al" Yankovic
You Can't Fix Stupid – Ron White

Classical
Best Classical Album
Mahler: Symphony No. 7
Michael Tilson Thomas, conductor; Andreas Neubronner, producer

Best Orchestra Performance
Mahler: Symphony No. 7
Michael Tilson Thomas, conductor; Andreas Neubronner, producer; Peter Laenger, engineer (San Francisco Symphony)

Best Opera Recording
"Golijov: Ainadamar: Fountain Of Tears"
Robert Spano, conductor; Valerie Gross & Sid McLauchlan, producers; Kelley O'Connor, Jessica Rivera & Dawn Upshaw, soloists; Stephan Flock & Wolf-Dieter Karwatky, engineers (Women Of The Atlanta Symphony Orchestra Chorus; Atlanta Symphony Orchestra)

Best Choral Performance
"Pärt: Da Pacem"
Paul Hillier, conductor; Brad Michel & Robina G. Young, producers; Brad Michel, engineer/mixer (Estonian Philharmonic Chamber Choir)

Best Instrumental Soloist(s) Performance (with Orchestra)
Messiaen: Oiseaux exotiques (Exotic Birds)
Angelin Chang (Cleveland Chamber Symphony)

Best Instrumental Soloist Performance (without Orchestra)
Chopin: Nocturnes
Maurizio Pollini, soloist; Christopher Alder, producer; Klaus Hiemann & Oliver Rogalla Von Heyden, engineers

Best Chamber Music Performance
"Intimate Voices"
Emerson String Quartet (Eugene Drucker, Lawrence Dutton, David Finckel & Philip Setzer), ensembles; Da-Hong Seetoo, producer

Best Small Ensemble Performance
"Padilla: Sun Of Justice"
Fred Vogler, producer; Peter Rutenberg, conductor; Los Angeles Chamber Singers' Capella (Corey Carleton), ensembles; Fred Vogler, engineer

Best Classical Vocal Performance
"Rilke Songs"
Lorraine Hunt Lieberson, soloist

Best Classical Contemporary Composition
"Golijov: Ainadamar: Fountain Of Tears"
Osvaldo Golijov, composer

Best Classical Crossover Album
"Simple Gifts"
Bryn Terfel, soloist; Sid McLauchlan, producer; Stephan Flock & Piotr Furmanczyk, engineers

Music Video
Best Short Form Music Video
"Here It Goes Again" – Ok Go
Best Long Form Music Video
Wings for Wheels: The Making of Born to Run – Bruce Springsteen

In memoriam 
Maynard Ferguson

Michael Brecker

Ray Barretto

Anita O'Day

Alice Coltrane

Robert Lockwood Jr.

Floyd Dixon

June Pointer

Arthur Lee (musician)

Phil Walden

Elisabeth Schwarzkopf

Malcolm Arnold

Sarah Caldwell

Denny Doherty

Henry Lewy

Syd Barrett

Ian Copeland

Ali Farka Touré

Soraya (musician)

Georgia Gibbs

Frankie Laine

Irving Green

Gene Pitney

Buck Owens

Cindy Walker

Buddy Killen

Freddy Fender

Desmond Dekker

Ed Bradley

J Dilla

Ruth Brown

Billy Preston

Arif Mardin

Gerald Levert

Ahmet Ertegun

James Brown

References

External links

49th Annual Grammy Awards

2007 music awards
 049
2007 in Los Angeles
Grammy
February 2007 events in the United States